An embassy is a permanent diplomatic mission. Embassy may also refer to:

Arts and entertainment
 Embassy, an art installation by Australian artist Richard Bell
 Embassy (novel), a 1969 novel by the British writer Stephen Coulter
 Embassy (film), a 1972 British film based on the novel
 Embassy (magazine), a division of Hill Times Publishing, Inc.
 Embassy Pictures, an independent film studio and distributor 
 Embassy Records, a record label owned by Woolworth Ltd 
 Embassy Television, a former American television production company (1982–1998)
 Embassy (TV series), an Australian television series

Other uses
 Embassy (cigarette), a British brand of cigarette 
 Embassy (professional wrestling), a wrestling stable in Ring of Honor

 PS Embassy, a ship

See also 
 The Embassy (disambiguation)
 Avco Embassy Television, a television production/distribution company operating from 1968 to 1976
 Embassy Suites by Hilton, a chain of hotels 
 Embassy Theatre (disambiguation)
 On the False Embassy, either of two famous judicial orations, both delivered in BCE 343
 The Embassy (disambiguation)